Narendra Damodar Jadhav (born 28 May 1953) is an Indian economist, educationist, public policy expert, professor and writer in English, Marathi and Hindi. He is an expert on Babasaheb Ambedkar.

Dr. Narendra Jadhav has completed (on 24 April 2022) his first term as a Member of Rajya Sabha, the upper house of Indian Parliament. He previously served as member of the Planning Commission of India and the National Advisory Council. Prior to this, he worked as Vice Chancellor of Savitribai Phule Pune University, International Monetary Fund (IMF) and headed economic research at the Reserve Bank of India.

Dr. Jadhav is a recipient of 72 national and international awards including four Honorary D.Litt Degrees and the title Commander of the Order of Academic Palms by the Government of France.

Dr Jadhav is about to complete his magnum opus – a 61-hour Mega Web Series titled ‘Indian Constitution: The Pride of Our Nation’. The Mega Web Series made in English with participation from 18 Supreme Court and High Court Judges, 34 MPs, 10 top Constitution experts and more than 30 domain experts of repute, is expected to be released in India and abroad soon in all major Indian languages, with a view to mark ‘Azadi ka Amrit Mohotsav’.

Early life and education 
Narendra Damodar Jadhav was born on 28 May 1953 to a Mahar family from the village of Ozar (Nashik District) and grew up in Mumbai suburb of Wadala. In 1956, his family converted to Buddhism. Jadhav attended Chhabildas High School, Dadar. He completed his BSc in Statistics from Ramnarain Ruia College, University of Mumbai in 1973 and MA in Economics from the University of Mumbai in 1975. He later earned a PhD in Economics from Indiana University, USA in 1986.

Professional career

Economist 

As a career economist, Jadhav worked for 31 years with the Reserve Bank of India, and those of Afghanistan and Ethiopia. He also worked as Adviser in the International Monetary Fund for over four years. He retired in October 2008 from the position of Principal Adviser and Chief Economist of the RBI. His writings on economics include: Ambedkar – An Economist Extraordinaire (2016), Monetary Policy, Financial Stability and Central Banking in India (2006), Re-emerging India – A Global Perspective (2005) and Monetary Economics for India (1994).

Currently, Jadhav is serving as chairman, Reserve Bank of India History Advisory Committee.

Education 

In 2006, Jadhav was appointed Vice Chancellor of the University of Pune. He enabled several initiatives aimed at improving the access and equity (through an Education Guarantee Scheme for underprivileged youth) and quality (through a complete revision of all 484 curricula). He also promoted the research environment through financial incentives and improved the governance through the Pune University Network project that connected the Main Campus with all 500+ Affiliated colleges using ICT. Jadhav also launched Samarth Bharat Abhiyan, a rural development program involving each college adopting a village to direct the youth power towards constructive social engagement in rural areas.

Jadhav has been Distinguished Professor in the Council for Social Development (CSD), New Delhi, with focused research on the New Education Policy for India. He is also serving as Emeritus Professor of Public Policy at MIT School of Government, Pune, teaching a range of Public Policy issues, especially Education, Health, Social Welfare and Economic Growth.

Jadhav's work at Pune led him to join the Planning Commission as a Member in-charge of Education, Labour and Employment, and Social Justice and Empowerment (2009–14), and as a Member, National Advisory Council (NAC) (2010–2014).

Planning Commission 

As a Member of the Planning Commission, Jadhav had a role in formulating the 12th Five Year Plan, especially in respect of Education and Skill Development. His contribution to formulation of the Rashtriya Uchchatar Shiksha Abhiyan (RUSA) scheme and developing the eco-system for Skills Development in India has been recognised. Equally noteworthy is his contribution to social justice through the Scheduled Caste Sub-Plan (SCSP), Tribal Sub-Plan (TSP) and Assessment and Monitoring Authority (AMA) for socio-religious communities.

National Advisory Council 

As a Member of the National Advisory Council (NAC) Jadhav's notable contributions include formulation of National Food Security Bill, implementation of the Right to Education (RTE) Act 2009, and empowerment of SC, ST, Minorities and Denotified Nomadic Tribes (DNTs) through education, SC & ST Prevention of Atrocities, Rights of persons with Disabilities, Child Labour (Prohibition and Regulation) and Abolition of Manual Scavenging.

Public policy 

Jadhav has authored 31 official reports on a wide range of public policy issues. These include reports titled Preparation of Perspective Plan for Higher Education (Government of Maharashtra, 2015), National Skills Qualification Framework (Government of India, 2013), Amendments to the Factories Act, 1948 (Government of India, 2012), Amendments to the Apprenticeship Act, 1961 (Government of India, 2011) and Vision on Vocational Education and Training (Government of India, 2011). Other reports authored by Jadhav include Farmers' Suicides (Government of Maharashtra 2008), Development Needs of the Ladakh Region (Ministry of Home Affairs, 2011) and Particularly Vulnerable Tribal Groups (PVTGs) (Government of India, 2013).

Member of Parliament 
Dr. Narendra Jadhav has completed (on 24 April 2022) his first term as a Member of Parliament - Rajya Sabha (nominated by the President of India). .

As an Independent Member of Parliament, Dr Jadhav has carved out a distinct place for himself through his studious interventions in the House and while serving on various Standing Committees (i.e. Finance, Commerce, Information Technology, Social Justice and Empowerment and Welfare of SC/ST), as well as Consultative Committees (i.e, External Affairs, Tourism and Culture).

Writings 

Jadhav, has written or edited 41 books in three languages – 21 in English, 13 in Marathi, and 7 in Hindi, besides over 300 research papers and articles.  These include 21 books on Babasaheb Ambedkar and a trilogy on Rabindranath Tagore, comprising an analytical biography, and translation of selected poems, short stories, plays, parodies, articles and speeches.

English books 
 Bharat Ratna Dr Babasaheb Ambedkar: An Intellectual Colossus, Great National Leader and Universal Champion of Human Rights Photo-Biography (Municipal Corporation of Greater Mumbai, 2016)
 Ambedkar: An Economist Extraordinaire (Konark Publishers, New Delhi, 2015) 
 Ambedkar: Awakening India’s Social Conscience (Konark Publishers, New Delhi, 2014) 
 Ambedkar Writes: Complete Writings of Dr Ambedkar (Edited) (2014) Vol.I : Political Writings 
 Ambedkar Writes: Complete Writings of Dr Ambedkar (Edited) (2014) Vol.II: Scholarly Writings (Sociology, Economics, Anthropology, Law, Constitution and Religion)(Konark Publishers, New Delhi, 2013) 
 Ambedkar Speaks: 301 Seminal Speeches (Edited) Vol I: Introduction, Autobiography Speeches, Guidance to Followers and Complete Bibliography 
 Ambedkar Speaks: 301 Seminal Speeches (Edited) Vol II: Social, Economic, Religion, Law and Constitution 
 Ambedkar Speaks: 301 Seminal Speeches (Edited) Vol III: Political Speeches (Konark Publishers, New Delhi) 
 Untouchables: My Family’s Triumphant Journey Out of the Caste System in Modern India (California University Press, USA 2007 and Simon and Schuster, USA) 
 Monetary Policy, Financial Stability and Central Banking in India (Macmillan India Ltd, New Delhi, 2006) 
 Re-emerging India – A Global Perspective (ICFAI University Press: Hyderabad, 2005) 
 Outcaste – A Memoir: Life and Triumphs of an Untouchable Family in India (Penguin, India, 2003) 
 Governors Speak (Edited) (Reserve Bank of India, 1997)
 CD Deshmukh Memorial Lectures (Edited) (Reserve Bank of India, 1996)
 Challenges to Indian Banking Competition, Globalization and Financial Markets (Edited) (Macmillan India Ltd, New Delhi, 1996) SBN: 0333930010
 Monetary Economics for India (Macmillan India Ltd, New Delhi, 1994) 
 Our Father and Us (Children's Edition, Korean) (Gimmyoung Publishers, Korea 2009)
 Dr Ambedkar: Economic Thoughts and Philosophy (Popular Prakashan, Mumbai, 1992) 
 Macroeconomic Investment Management in LDCs – A Social Cost Benefit Approach (Indiana University, USA, 1986)

Hindi books 
 Dr Ambedkar : Atmakatha Evam Jansanvad (Prabhat Prakashan , New Delhi, 2015)
 Dr Ambedkar : Samajik Vichar Evam Darshan (Prabhat Prakashan, New Delhi, 2015) 
 Dr Ambedkar : Arthik Vichar Evam Darshan (Prabhat Prakashan , New Delhi, 2015) 
 Dr Ambedkar : Rajneeti, Dharm Aur Sanvidhan Vichar (Prabhat Prakashan , New Delhi, 2015) 
 Vishwa Manav Rabindranath Tagore (Prabhat Prakashan , New Delhi, 2015)

Marathi books 
 Yugpravartak Mahamanav – Bharat Ratna Dr Babasaheb Ambedkar (photo-biography, Brihan Mumbai Mahanagar Palika, 2016)
 Pradnya Surya Dr Ambedkar: Samagra Vyacharik Charitra (Granthali, Mumbai, 2014)
 Pradnya Mahamanavachi: Dr Babasaheb Ambedkar Samagra Lekhan Karya (Edited) Vol.I: Rajkiya Lekhan
 Pradnya Mahamanavachi: Dr Babasaheb Ambedkar Samagra Lekhan Karya (Edited) Vol.II: Artha Shastra, Samaj Shastra, Kayda-Sanvidhan Aani Dharma Shastra (Granthali, Mumbai, 2013)
 LASAVI Mazhya Samagra Abhivyakticha (Granthali, Mumbai, 2013)
 Bol Mahamanavache: 500 Marmabhedi Bhashane (Edited) Vol. I: Atmanivedan, Anuyayi Margadarshan Aani Samagra Suchi
 Bol Mahamanavache: 500 Marmabhedi Bhashane (Edited) Vol. II: Samajik, Arthik, Dharmik Aani Kayda — Sanvidhan Vishayak Bhashane
 Bol Mahamanavache: 500 Marmabhedi Bhashane (Edited) Vol. III: Rajkiya Bhashane (Granthali, Mumbai, 2012)
 Ravindranath Tagore: Yuga Nirmata Vishvamanav (Granthali, Mumbai, 2011)
 Ravindranath Tagore: Samagra Sahitya Darshan (Granthali, Mumbai, 2011)
 Bhaya Shoonya Chitta Jeth: Ravindranathanchya 151 Pratinidhik Kavita (Granthali, Mumbai, 2010)
 Aamcha Baap Aan Amhi (Granthali, Mumbai. 1993)
 Dr Ambedkar: Arthik Vichar Aani Tatvadnyan (Sugava Prakashan, Pune, 1992)

Autobiographical works 
Jadhav's three autobiographical novels – Aamcha Baap Aan Amhi, (Marathi, 1993), Outcaste (English, 2002) and Untouchables (English, 2005) – depict the story of the struggle for human dignity by a Dalit family. Aamcha Baap Aan Amhi with 199 editions so far has reportedly become the largest selling book in the history of Marathi literature. Moreover, Untouchables and Aamcha Baap Aan Amhi have been translated into several Indian languages including Hindi, Gujarati, Kannada, Tamil, Urdu, Konkani, and Punjabi (Sahitya Akademi Award winner), besides French, Spanish, Korean and Thai.

References

External links 

 Narendra Jadhav, website
 Dr Narendra Jadhav : A Glimpse of the Persona 
 नरेंद्र जाधव (परिचय) 
 Asia Times article by Narendra Jadhav
 Narenda Jadhav, Partha Ray, Dhritidyuti Bose, Indranil Sen Gupta: The Reserve Bank of India’s Balance Sheet: Analytics and Dynamics of Evolution, November 2004.

20th-century Indian economists
1953 births
Living people
University of Mumbai alumni
Indiana University alumni
Indian civil servants
Members of National Advisory Council, India
International Monetary Fund people

Marathi-language writers
Marathi people
Members of the Planning Commission of India
Scientists from Mumbai
20th-century Indian educational theorists
Nominated members of the Rajya Sabha
21st-century Indian economists
Scholars from Mumbai
Indian Buddhists
20th-century Buddhists
21st-century Buddhists
Indian officials of the United Nations
Dalit writers
Rajya Sabha members from Maharashtra
Hindi-language writers
English-language writers from India
Buddhist writers